Awara is a 2012 Bengali romantic action comedy movie. It is a remake of the 2008 Telugu movie Krishna having Ravi Teja and Trisha Krishnan in the lead role. Directed by Ravi Kinagi and produced by Shree Venkatesh Films this film stars Jeet and Sayantika Banerjee in lead roles. In this film Kharaj Mukherjee as Madan impressed the audience. The film is placed List of highest-grossing Bengali films.

Plot
The film is about Surya Narayan (Jeet) who was once a software engineer but quits his job to give it to his poor friend and is unemployed in the city of Cooch Behar. Poulomi (Sayantika Banerjee) is a girl from Kolkata who studies in college and comes to Cooch Behar for her vacation to stay with her elder brother Madan Mohan (Kharaj Mukherjee) and his wife. Surya falls in love with Poulomi at first sight in Ransh Mela and starts chasing her to win her heart and enters the upper portion of their house as tenants with his elder brother, Upendra Narayan (Biswajit Chakraborty) and sister in law (Tulika Basu). In this process Surya will have clash with local rowdy Shanatan Panja (Tamal Roychowdhury). Mistaking him to be one tapori, Poulomi hates him first but later on she realizes his true nature . She returns to Kolkata and lives with her older brother (Ashish Vidyarthi), a former builder and now a very powerful rowdy who is very possessive and protective about his sister. Surya follows Poulomi to Kolkata and works his way into their house with the help of Madan Mohan and finally both of them confess their love. There, Surya knows the flashback of Poulomi and how she is being chased by the notorious and cruel Tony Bharadwaj (Mukul Dev) assisted by his uncle (Supriyo Dutta) for marriage. Surya fights Tony, Poulomi's older brother kills Tony, and Surya marries Poulomi.

Cast

Soundtrack

References

External links
 

2012 action comedy films
2012 films
Bengali remakes of Telugu films
Bengali-language Indian films
2010s Bengali-language films
Bengali action comedy films
Films scored by Jeet Ganguly
Films scored by Dev Sen